Kot Gulla is a village and union council, an administrative subdivision, of Chakwal District in the Punjab Province of Pakistan, it is part of Lawa Tehsil.

Villages of union council Kot Gulla 
 Dhoke Chhoi, (Bahi Brothers Bahi Brothers Facebook Page)
 Mahbubabad 
 Dhoke Mail,
 Dhok Malkanwali (shamraiz)
 Walaveen
 Dhok Jahat
 Dhok Larian (Malik Ahsan Awan belongs to this village) 
 Dhok Jhandi,
 Dhok Pamri Khel,
 Dhok Nakka,
 Jhodal,
 Matoki
 Dhoke Reehan,
 Lal Khel Dhoke Adam Khan(Dheri)
 Dhok Dera Sultan Ali Khushal Garhetc.

References 

Populated places in Chakwal District